Philopotamidae is a family of insects in the order Trichoptera, the caddisflies. They are known commonly as the finger-net caddisflies.

The aquatic larvae of these caddisflies spin mesh nets of silk in flowing water to catch food. A larva can spin over a kilometer of extremely thin silk to create its intricate net.

Subfamilies and genera include:

Subfamily Chimarrinae
Chimarra
Chimarrhodella
Subfamily Paulianodinae
Paulianodes
Subfamily Philopotaminae
Cabreraia
Cryptobiosella
Doloclanes
Dolomyia
Dolophilodes
Dolopsyche
Edidiehlia
Gunungiella
Hydrobiosella
Kisaura
Neobiosella
Philopotamus
Wormaldia
Xenobiosella

See also
Dolophilodes distinctus

References

Trichoptera families